Balbir Singh Verma (born 04 April 1971) is an Indian politician, who currently serves as Member of Legislative Assembly from Chopal constituency. Balbir Singh Verma won from Chopal constituency in 2017 state assembly elections. He is also accused of tax evasion of 3.5 crores.

Early life and education
Balbir Singh was born on 4 April 1971 in Village Thanadhar, Chopal, Himachal Pradesh to Dharam Das Verma.

Balbir Singh Verma after his 12th examination joined BSF. During his BSF duty, he also worked in United Nations Organization Police Mission abroad.

Politics
Balbir Singh's active state politics started from 2012.

He previously won Himachal Pradesh Legislative Assembly Election in 2012 and became member of Public Undertakings and Rural Planning Committees during 2013-17.

Then in 2017, he was re-elected to the thirteenth Himachal Pradesh Legislative Assembly in December, 2017.

Verma has been accused of tax evasion of 3.5 crores. His bank accounts have been seized in this tax evasion case.

References

Bharatiya Janata Party politicians from Himachal Pradesh
1971 births
Living people
Himachal Pradesh MLAs 2017–2022